Nemai Ghosh is the name of:

 Nemai Ghosh (cricketer) (born 1939), Indian cricketer
 Nemai Ghosh (director) (1914–1988), Indian film director and cinematographer
 Nemai Ghosh (photographer) (1934–2020), Indian photographer most known for working with Satyajit Ray
 Nemai Ghosh (actor), Indian film actor in Bengali cinema, Kaal (2007)